Linda Bolder (Hebrew: לינדה בולדר, born 3 July 1988 in Velserbroek, Netherlands) is a Dutch-born Israeli Olympic judoka.

A three-time European age-group judo champion as a junior, two-time Dutch senior women's champion, and silver medalist in the 2013 European Judo Championships, she emigrated to Israel with her Jewish husband in January 2015. Bolder represented Israel at the 2016 Summer Olympics in the women's under-70kg competition, making it to the quarter-finals.

Judo career
Bolder started taking judo classes at the age of four.

For the Netherlands (2004–14)
In 2004, Bolder won both the Under-17 Dutch Championship and the Under-20 Dutch Championship in the U63 weight class.
 She repeated as Under-20 Dutch Champion in 2006 and 2007, but in the U70 weight class. In 2009 and 2012 she won the senior Dutch Championship in the U70 weight class.

In 2004, she won the Under-17 European Cadet Championship, in 2007 Bolder won the Under-20 European U20 Championship, and in 2008 she won the Under-23 European Championship.

In 2005 Bolder won the Kent International Crystal Palace in the U70 weight class, in 2010 she won the IJF World Cup Cairo and the Grand Prix Qingdao in the U70 weight class, and in 2012 she won the World Cup Rome and the Grand Slam Tokyo in the U70 weight class and the Swiss Judo Open Geneve in the U78 weight class.

Bolder won the silver medal in the 2013 European Judo Championships, representing the Netherlands.

In 2014, she won the Grand Slam Paris in the U70 weight class.  In February 2014 Bolder was injured in Düsseldorf, Germany, and had knee ligament reconstruction surgery that kept her from competing for the remainder of the year.

For Israel (2015–present)
On 1 January 2015 Bolder made aliyah by moving to Israel with her Dutch Jewish husband, a businessman, and started to represent the Israeli National Team that year.  She trains with the Israeli team at the Wingate Institute in Netanya, Israel. Her coaches are Ben Rietdijk and Shany Hershko.

In 2015, she won the Samsun Grand Prix and the Zagreb Grand Prix, and in January 2016 Bolder won the Havana Grand Prix, in the U70 weight class.

Olympics
Bolder represented Israel at the 2016 Summer Olympics, as the 9th seed in the women's under-70kg competition. She won her first round match against Congolese-born Brazilian Yolande Mabika on 10 August, with a choke hold just over a minute into the bout, and won her second-round match against Korean Kim Seong-yeon. In the quarter-finals, she was defeated by Sally Conway of the United Kingdom. She competed for a chance at the bronze medal in the repechage match, but lost to Spain's María Bernabéu.

Medals
Sources:

References

External links
 Linda Bolder official page

 
 
 
 

1988 births
Living people
Israeli female judoka
Judoka at the 2015 European Games
European Games competitors for Israel
Judoka at the 2016 Summer Olympics
Olympic judoka of Israel
People from Velsen
Dutch emigrants to Israel
Dutch female judoka
Sportspeople from North Holland